"Second Go" is the third single from Canadian singer-songwriter Lights debut album The Listening. It was released on February 16, 2010 in the United States.

Music video
The video follows Lights going through a plain white house, painting it throughout the video with various colours. This is the first video since the release of her EP that she has not gone with a space theme. The video was shot in only one take. The video premiered on MuchMusic on May 13, 2010.

Track listing

Charts

References

2010 singles
Lights (musician) songs
2009 songs
Songs written by Lights (musician)